Philautus aurantium (common names: Mendolong bubble-nest frog, golden-legged bush frog) is a species of frog in the family Rhacophoridae. It is endemic to Borneo and found in the Mount Kinabalu region in Sabah and Sarawak, Malaysia. Philautus gunungensis is sometimes considered its subspecies, Philautus aurantium gunungensis.

Description
The body is sand coloured with black spots scattered along flanks, on posterior part of dorsum, and on legs. It has pale orange groin and ventral side of thighs. Tympanum is indistinct.

Habitat and conservation
Its natural habitats are primary montane and submontane forests  asl. Males call from shrubs and small trees 2–4 metres above the ground. It is threatened by habitat loss caused by clear-cutting. It is present in the Kinabalu National Park.

References

aurantium
Endemic fauna of Borneo
Endemic fauna of Malaysia
Amphibians of Malaysia
Amphibians described in 1989
Taxonomy articles created by Polbot
Amphibians of Borneo